Volker Weidermann (born 1969) is a German writer and literary critic.  He currently works for Frankfurter Allgemeine Zeitung as the literary director and editor of the newspaper's Sunday edition. In 2015, he changed to Der Spiegel.

Life 
Weidermann studied political science along with German language and linguistics at Heidelberg and Berlin.   For many years he wrote as a Literary critic for the Berlin-based Tageszeitung, where he was employed as editor between 1998 and 2001. He then switched to the "Literary directorship" of the then newly established Sunday edition of the venerable Frankfurter Allgemeine Zeitung.   Since 2003 he has headed up the publication jointly with Claudius Seidl.

Wiedermann is publishing the collected output of the prolific pacifist writer Armin T. Wegner: the first volume appeared in 2012.   That was also the year in which he took on a guest professorship at Washington University in St. Louis, Missouri. He lives in Berlin.

Publications 
March 2006 saw the appearance of Weidermann's literary history, "Lichtjahre" (literally "light years"), subtitled, rather more helpfully. "A short history of German Literature from 1945 till today". This gave rise to a discussion about the division of literary criticism in Germany into two mutually unhearing camps, characterized by Hubert Winkels of the national radio station as the "Emphatic and the Gnostic". The distinction drawn by Winkels, writing in Die Zeit, is between literary critics such as Weidermann, who paid close attention to the vitality, realism and passion of an author's output and those who actually concentrated on the textual form and style along with the language and the dramaturgy. One camp hankers after "true life" while the other looks out for "true literature". Predictably, having defined the polar opposites in this way, Winkels is critical of both.

Weidermann marked the 100th anniversary of the birth of Max Frisch with a critical new biography, published in 2010, entitled Max Frisch. Sein Leben, seine Bücher ("Max Frisch: His life and his books").
Volker Weidermann:  Principal publications
 Lichtjahre: Eine kurze Geschichte der deutschen Literatur von 1945 bis heute. Kieperheuer & Witsch, Köln 2006, .
 Als Taschenbuch: btb, München 2007, .
 Als Hörbuch: Hörverlag, München 2006, .
 Das Buch der verbrannten Bücher. Kiepenheuer & Witsch, Köln 2008, .
 Max Frisch. Sein Leben, seine Bücher. Kiepenheuer & Witsch, Köln 2010, .
 Ostende: 1936, Sommer der Freundschaft. Kiepenheuer & Witsch, Köln 2014, .
 Dreamers: When the Writers Took Power, Germany 1918. Pushkin Press, 2018.
In 2008 the "Book of the Burned Books" ("Buch der verbrannten Bücher") appeared, comprising 131 miniature overviews of the lives and works of authors whose works were included in the 1933 Book Burnings.   In 2009 this book won Weidermann the Kurt-Tucholsky-Preis for "literary journalism".
The biographical novel Ostende: 1936, Sommer der Freundschaft (Ostend 1936: Summer of Friendship) appeared in 2014. It concerns the friendship of two very different writers, Stefan Zweig and Joseph Roth, and their meeting up at the Belgian coastal resort in 1936. Weidermann addressed the same subject in a nonfiction book that has been translated into English. Other exiled German writers and artists were at Ostend at the same time, including Roth's latest love, Irmgard Keun, along with Hermann Kesten, Egon Erwin Kisch, Arthur Koestler, Willi Münzenberg, Ernst Toller and Toller's young wife, Christiane Grautoff.

External links 

 
 
 Zusammenfassung der Reaktionen auf Lichtjahre bei single-generation.de
 Seite der FAZ über Volker Weidermann

References 

1969 births
Writers from Darmstadt
German journalists
German male journalists
German newspaper journalists
German literary critics
20th-century German writers
Living people
20th-century German male writers
ZDF people
Der Spiegel people
Die Tageszeitung people